Newstead railway station or Bradshaw railway station, as it was referred to in early editions of the timetable, served the village of Newstead, Melrose, Scotland, from 1849 to 1859 on the Waverley Route.

History 
The station opened in November 1849 by the North British Railway. The exact location of the station is not confirmed, but it was believed to have been at either side of Haseldean Lane. It originally appeared as 'Newbridge' in the Bradshaw timetable. The nearby goods yard may have been adjacent to the site of the station, but there is little information. The station disappeared from the timetable in October 1852. It was presumed to have closed to passengers and it closed completely in 1859 or after.

References 

Disused railway stations in the Scottish Borders
Former North British Railway stations
Railway stations in Great Britain opened in 1849
Railway stations in Great Britain closed in 1852